The Israel Roller Hockey League is the biggest Roller Hockey Clubs Championship in Israel.

History and Information About the Israel Association
The Roller Hockey sport was brought to Israel in 1957 by "a handful of fanatics" led by Mr. Aaron Jordan. The association was founded in 1973 by organized skaters, who later grew and developed under the name Association of skates in Israel. Today, the association contains more than 800 members from 30 registered clubs. It also provides guidance and support to union workers, and contributes to the development of skating sports such as figure skating, Rink Hockey, inline skating and roller speed skating. All registered clubs are subject to local management committees consisting of corporate professionals. Each year the organization produces and distributes guidelines to suggest courses of action according to the needs of the area and the international guidelines for the organization. As a full-fledged member of the International Roller Sports Federation and the European Confederation of Roller Skating, the Israeli union is recognized by the International Olympic Committee and maintains a full professional cooperation with the Wingate Institute as well as the Ministry of Science Council of the gambling culture and sports.

The game originated from an ancient Greek sport which involved throwing a ball with a stick, similar to hockey. The remarkable discovery was made in Athens in 1922 and suggests that the sport comes from the East. For example, an interesting sculpture from a wall Themistocles built depicts a team of six athletes, with two players in the center while the other four flank them, waiting to receive the kick start. Native American men and women practiced a similar sport for many centuries. They employed balls and sticks of various materials, such as wood, bone, and deer skin. The clubs vary in length and curvature and are often adorned with various designs. The targets consisted of two poles nailed to the ground at each end, with a separation of somewhere between 50 and 200 meters. Occasionally they would play without poles and simply try to get the ball past the gatekeepers and across a line representing the goal.

The Arabs have also had since time immemorial, a game similar to hockey, is "Kouros", which is played with a ball made of palm
fibers tied with spelt and using a stick slightly curved at the end opposite the handle. And the Chileans "cineca", in which an
unspecified number of players divided into two camps. Each is fitted with a curved stick at its end, used to throw a ball toward a
given point, while the opposing side seeks to prevent it and make it happen contrary to the
countryside.

According to a manuscript of Fitzstephen, hockey dates in England since 1175, little more or less.
Certainly many objects are available to confirm this. In some windows of Canterbury and Gloucester
cathedrals are painted figures representing even player: Canterbury has a stick in his right hand that
supports field, and from Gloucester has caught the stick with both hands in attitude drive against the
ball. These stained glass windows dating from the thirteenth century.

The English are derived from another hockey game Irish is called "hurley" and also "hurlino", a game
that was practiced very hard with many players. The modern hockey made its appearance early in the
second half of the nineteenth century, namely ago over a hundred years. Such as hockey was played on a field with a certain size,
150 by 84 yards, a rectangle whose side lines start at 21, 50 and 75 yards. The ball was 5 inches in diameter and weighing 7
ounces. Frames the two posts were separated from each other 21 feet, joined by a bar up to 8 feet above the ground. As can be
seen, a large frame (6.40 by 2.44 meters). With such a size the first players had to mark many necessarily so.

Previously, teams were formed at random and did not represent any club or society.

In the year 1875 a company resident in London, called "The Men Hockey Association," that is, associations Men's Hockey, gave a
good step to correct the old rules in plan to improve the game, reducing the field, the framework and the number of players, already
set in eleven as in football. There was then a dozen clubs who practiced this sport, being the most important Blackheath, Molesey,
Wimbledom, Earling, Surbiton, Teddington, Eliot Place School, Blackhead, and Trinity College, Cambridge.

The final step was given the January 16, 1886, in which the clubs mentioned were the Hockey Federation. It also considers this as
the date of the creation of modern hockey. The 19 representatives of the eight clubs (three delegates were 3, and three others, 2)
drafted the regulation, which was submitted and approved in the first special meeting of the Committee, on February 3 the same
year in the Cannon Street Hotel, London. That regulation containing 19 articles, the original was 20 but was omitted on 19 on the
duration of that game was 80 minutes.

History of skating

The story tells us about other inventors of wheels but in 1813 when Jean Garcin, built a wooden wheel that patents after two years
with remarkable success. He created a School of Skating, but the practice of apprentices caused numerous accidents that
prompted the closure of the school and its activities.

Another patent of a skid on wheels was filed by M. Petitbled in France in 1819. These skates were wheeled metal, wood or ivory,
mounted under a wooden base with straps to hold the foot. The runners were from a single size and as the wheels were fixed, it
was impossible to move by a curved line.

In 1823, in London, Robert John Tyers patented model "Rolito". The British patent office, "Rolito" was described as a "device to be
attached to the shoes, boots or other item that covers the foot in order to move out of necessity or pleasure." This model was done
with 5 wheels fixed line and was an event that soon attracted public attention. It soon emerged patented many models, each a little
more sophisticated than its previous model.

Years later, in 1867, the invention of Jean Garcin was picked up by some British industrial previously perfected, as presented and
explained at the World Fair in Paris. This project was patented in New York by James Leonard Plinton, with the coupling of a
braking mechanism consisting of a rubber stick in the front.

Shortly after that skates were popularized Plimpton, track skating became meeting places.

In England, skating wheels furor was traditional in many places. But since many tracks were poorly maintained and regulated, the
first wave of popularity did not last long.

In 1876 opens in Paris on first Skating Center as a fashionable sport and mounted with all kinds of luxuries and details to the delight

of the Parisian aristocracy, who took the sport as skating fashion. From that moment proliferated track skating across Europe.
Germany had 50 tracks, 30 Great Britain and the United States began its expansion. Faced with this growth had to organize the
skating and, for that reason, began to be born clubs and competitions. Edward Crawford was brought new ideas for Chicago sports
competitions and practice among them the roller hockey.

In the year 1905 is based on the England AMATEUR HOCKEY ASSOCIATION, forerunner of skating at all levels, but in 1901 there
were already teams which competed with each other but without playing. The first news of matches taking place between clubs
from different countries dating from November 1910. Arguably, therefore, that England was the real birthplace of hockey in 1909
and began play in Kent County.

The skating was already a reality in three of its modalities (speed, artistic and hockey), but had to sort and organize the sport. In
April 1924 met in Montreux (Switzerland) representatives of France, Germany, Britain and Switzerland, and founded the Federation
Internationale du Patinage A caravan sites (FIPR), being named president of the same Swiss Fred Renkewitz, personage of great
importance in dissemination of road hockey around the world.

The year 1946 was the Spanish Hockey Federation and skating and Spain debuted in international competitions in 1947 in a
tournament held in Lisbon (Portugal).

Roller Hockey

Principles of roller hockey in the world. The roller hockey was born in Chicago, but in the first place that appeared hockey is a
drawing carved in an Egyptian tomb in the Nile Valley. The first to touch an item on the skid was Hans Brinker, who devised i built
the first round metal skid in the year 1733. These wheels were placed in a skid with metal rim created by Joseph Lunds, but was left
aside by the many imperfections and that was soon forgotten. In 1760 Joseph Merlin devised metal wheel that was the precursor of
the present. In London the marketed. Also in this year presented his invention in a fashion show, but as the parquet floor as the
wheels crashed. After Merlin there were other people: Luis Van Lede wheels manufactured in 1790 "skid terre" which were a failure;
Jean Garcin in 1813 patented the wheels of wood under the name "Gypsy"; Pettibled also highlighted in 1819, Tyre in 1823 and
Kubler in 1834, although all three failed.

In 1867 the invention of Garcin of wooden wheels was picked up by some Englishmen that the industrial perfected. James Leonard
Plinton the patented in New York, but the coupling with a wad of rubber on the front that allowed halt when ibas backward and
forward to boot. In 1867 opened the first center in Paris skating for the aristocracy. From that time began to have many clues, wood
(being the most resistant wooden wheels), across Europe.

Edward Crawford introduced the sport in Europe in the early twentieth century with an adaptation of ice hockey to the wooden floors
Europeans. It was very popular in England and in 1905 founded the Amateur Hockey Association, which originated the national
association of hockey in 1913. The hockey began to spread through the rest of Europe, especially Switzerland and France, but not
until 1924 was organized internationally. Fred Renkewitz created the International Roller Skating Federation (FIRS) in Montreux
(Switzerland), meeting representatives Switzerland, France, Germany and Britain. Years later entered Belgium, Italy, Portugal and
Spain in 1946, but was practised in Barcelona since 1915, and since 1928 also had its Catalonia regional federation. The first
European Cup for clubs was played in 1926, and in 1936 started the World Cup. Before World War II, England was the best
country, but from 1947 began to win Portugal, Spain and Italy in international competitions. In South America, Argentina was the
better team.

The roller hockey is played on a track terrazzo mainly, but also may be or cement floor, surrounded by a fence to avoid leaving the
ball. Each team consists of five players, who move on wheeled skates and can not intervene in the game when not in possession of
the stick. All incorporate a series of protections in their clothing. The game is divided into two parts, 25 minutes each -20 teams in
international competitions with a break-intermediate 5 minutes. This pattern emerged in Britain during the s. XIX.

In 1924 was first regulated in Switzerland and that same year formed the Federation of International Hockey skates.

Although no category Olympic exhibition sport was in the 1992 Barcelona Games. Spain and Portugal are the countries with more
tradition in their practice.

HISTORY OF SKATING WHEELS

Ever wonder who invented the first pair of skates?
Where? When?
How were the runners 100 years ago?
How much resembled those that today you have you?
So probably enjoy this page ...

The official credit for the invention of the first pair of skates, be attributed to Joseph
Merlin, a luthier who was born in Huys, Belgium on September 17, 1735.

In May 1770, Merlin went to London as director of the Museum Cox in Spring
Gardens, where he exhibited several of his musical instruments. Merlin also had
examples of his work at his home in Oxford Street (emotionally called "the cave of
Merlin"), where he also showed his unique invention:
a pair of skates on wheels.

But his place in history as an inventor, also is accompanied by an amusing anecdote about the presentation of his invention in
society:
A letter from the period read: "... designed to rotate on small metal wheels. Provided a couple of these skates and a violin, he joined
a dance dress held in Carlisle-House, Soho Square in the heart of London . An additional ways to reduce their speed or control their
direction, was to give valued against a mirror located at the end of the ballroom. Not only resulted in breakage of the same and his
violin but also was severely hurt. "

After this fiasco, not again oirse on skates until 1790, when a Parisian blacksmith invented a skid on wheels called "skate-a-terre."
However, it took about 25 years to win recognition that this skid. In Berlin in 1818, skates on wheels were used for the first time in
the premiere of the ballet "Der Maler oder die Wintervergnügungen" ( "The artist or winter Pleasures"). The ballet was created to
skate on ice, but as it was not possible to produce ice on stage, were used wheeled skates.

The first patent of a skid on wheels was filed by M. Petitbled in France
in 1819. These skates were wheeled metal, wood or ivory, mounted
under a wooden base with straps to hold the foot. The runners were
from a single size and as the wheels were fixed, it was impossible to
move by a curved line.

In 1823, in London, Robert John Tyers patented model "Rolito".
The British patent office, "Rolito" was described as a "device to be
attached to the shoes, boots or other item that covers the foot in order
to move out of necessity or pleasure."
This model was done with 5 wheels fixed line and was an event that
soon attracted public attention. It soon emerged patented many
models, each a little more sophisticated than its previous model.

Some of the earliest models skate

So the runners began to spread but took a long time until it was a real
success. In Germany was where it was really popular. In 1840, in a
tavern near the city of Berlin, thirsty customers were served by girls on
skates. This development attracted the attention of many, not to
mention improving service.

In 1857 two tracks were open for skating in Convent Garden
and Strand, two very important areas in central London.

But not until 1863, in the United States, James Leonard Plimpton thought of putting wheels under rubber suspensions and possible
maneuver curves describing the skid.
These skates were two pairs of parallel wheels back and forth as we know today and were by far much higher than all invented so
far.

Shortly after that skates were popularized Plimpton, track skating became meeting places.
In England, skating wheels furor was traditional in many places. But since many tracks were poorly maintained and regulated,
the first wave of popularity did not last long.

Plimpton also founded the first association of wheels skid on U.S. society and organized the first international skating wheels. It
also gave rise to the top of skill competencies (the Medal Plimpton) and developed a system of 'categories' skid.

Samuel Winslow, became involved with skating wheels when he was hired by James
Leonard Plimpton to manufacture skates that he had invented. In the 1870s, Winslow
began manufacturing its own models of skates and was sued for patent infringement by
Plimpton. Both agreed to continue with the manufacture of skates. During the 1880s, over
1 million pairs of skates were in use in over 3000 U.S. tracks. On the photo at left is the
model "A Vineyard" in line "Vineyard", produced during the years 1880-81 by the company
of Samuel Winslow. His skates were the most popular at that time in the United States.

Improvements mechanical skates helped the
renaissance of skating. The skates were added
rulemanes needle (very thin rollers instead of bolillas
as we know now) which allowed better than earlier
models rolling. So, fashion won new followers who no
longer had to make so much effort to skate.

Runs new and larger were opened in big cities. In Chicago, for example, a track under the
name Casino Rink was opened in 1884 and was the scene for polo matches (on
rollerblades), racing and dancing on skates.
However, with the invention of cycling in 1890, his popularity into oblivion to put skates on
wheels during the next decade.

In 1902, the coliseum in Chicago (United States), was opened to the public a new
skating rink. At the opening night there were 7000 people. Now, with his skates and
had rulemanes of bolilla.
In 1908, Madison Square Garden was converted into ice rink and for the next 2 years,
hundreds of tracks were opened in the United States and England.
The skating remained popular until the First World War, after which, cinema, dance
and the car caught the attraction of the public and again, the skid on wheels declined
in response, but never completely went into oblivion.

Thus, skates on wheels went through ups and downs throughout their history,
from the efforts of Joseph Merlin until the use of rulemanes of bolillas during the
early years of 1900.
In the 60's, technology (with the advent of plastics) helped to grow this activity
reaching the age of majority.

Perhaps in the future, skates on wheels come to resemble something one of the projects
that the first inventors had imagined.

Founders

Jordan Aaron,
Aba Beker,
Abraham Moses, 
Mordechai sas,
Sorkin Arthur (deceased),
Phillip Abud,
Ramon Irit,
tzvi shot and
Zora Auliven.

Honorary Members

Yoav Kadosh,
Judit Schumacher,
Isaac Ashkenazi,
Galiichagoets Sima,
Holtzberg Ida (z),
Wexler Janna,
Efraim Levin,
Eliezer Elkin,
Luptin Ethel,
Flatzor Ester (deceased),
Pulber Rivi,
Shemko Nathan and
Sar Haya.

Goals

The primary goals of the league include:

 Managing and supervising the organization of national, international, league, and cup competitions
 Encouraging a professional representation for the skating arena throughout the world
 Creating, developing, and nurturing professional relationships with international associations and skating organizations
 Establishing regulations, instructions, and procedures for the registered clubs within its jurisdiction
 Obtaining and negotiating the necessary budget measures for union purposes
 Publishing a variety of professional movies, journal articles, and other content related to rink hockey, figure skating, inline skating, and roller speed skating
 Organizing mutual funds to provide income for development goals and the union as a whole
 Promoting trainers, judges, administrators, instructional courses, and clubs in Israel and abroad
 Amplifying and nurturing culture in the public consciousness regarding the roller skating industry
 Any other action authorized by the General Assembly in relation to management of the union or promotion of the industry

Staff Training and Judging

So far, six courses were held in artistic skating instructors - summer projects in the school's coaches and instructors at the Wingate Institute.
In 1997-1999 held the first course of its kind accredited training course for judges and coaches at school graduate of the Institute in cooperation with the International Federation Wegyet artistic skating.
Hockey industry is so far only two courses and instructors can say as of today is clear and urgent need arises additional training manuals, they can provide an answer to growing demand in recent years.

Juniors league
In Israel, the Juniors league divided to 2. north and south.
The south league administered by Radan Reis and Lior Uliel. There are a few teams, as Tzur Hadasa,Bee'r Tuvia,Nataf, etc.'.
The north league administered by Alon Vizman. There are a few teams, some of them are competitiveness and some are there not.
example for some competitiveness teams : Kiryat Bialik, Ramat Yishai, Nofit, The Academia for Galgiliot, Hayogev, Maalot, Bet Lehem.
The junior league is divided to age strata:
U16 (15-16) U14 (13-14) U12 (11-12) and U10 (9-10)
some of the junior U16 league play with their senior clubs.

Israel League
Some of clubs that competed in the season of 2010 were: Kiryat Bialik, Ramat Yishai, Nofit, The Academia for Galgiliot, Hayogev, Maalot, Bet Lehem.

List of Winners

Number of Israeli National Seniors Championships by team

Israel Cup
Israel Cup is the second main competition of Roller Hockey in Israel, and is disputed by all the Roller Hockey clubs in Israel.

Winners

Number of Israel Cups by Senior team

External links

Israeli websites
Roller Hockey in Israel
website of Academia Galgiliot
website of La Hockey

International
 Roller Hockey links worldwide
 Mundook-World Roller Hockey
Hardballhock-World Roller Hockey
Inforoller World Roller Hockey 
 World Roller Hockey Blog
rink-hockey-news - World Roller Hockey

I
Roller hockey in Israel
Wingate Institute
National roller hockey championships